Mentzelia memorabilis, the nine-eleven blazingstar, is a shrub-like perennial endemic to the Uinkaret Plateau in Mohave County Arizona and adjacent Washington County Utah. This is a species of conservation concern throughout its range.

Nine-eleven blazingstar can be found between 1400 and 1700 m in elevation growing on gypsiferous outcrops of the Harrisburg formation.

References

 Flora of North America Species Description

External links
Herbarium Specimen of Mentzelia memorabilis;

memorabilis
Endemic flora of the United States
Flora without expected TNC conservation status